Alla Lysenko (born 31 May 1969) is a Paralympic rower for Ukraine. She lost her legs due to a car accident in 1996. She has been world champion twice and at the 2012 Summer Paralympics she won a gold medal in women's arms-only (ASW1x) single sculls.

References

External links
 
 

1969 births
Living people
Ukrainian female rowers
Paralympic rowers of Ukraine
Paralympic gold medalists for Ukraine
Rowers at the 2012 Summer Paralympics
Medalists at the 2012 Summer Paralympics
Paralympic medalists in rowing
21st-century Ukrainian women